Mikołaj Nicholas "Nick" Harbaruk (August 16, 1943March 10, 2011) was a professional ice hockey player. Harbaruk played 364 games in the National Hockey League (NHL) and 181 in the World Hockey Association (WHA). Harbaruk played for the Pittsburgh Penguins, St. Louis Blues, and Indianapolis Racers.

Harbaruk was of Ukrainian descent, born in Poland and immigrated to Toronto, Ontario at the age of five. Harbaruk died from bone cancer on March 10, 2011, at the age of 67. At the time of his death, he was survived by his wife, Nancy, and two daughters.

Playing career
Prior to his NHL career, Harbaruk played three seasons with the Toronto Marlboros and helped the Marlies win the 1964 Memorial Cup. Harbaruk then spent five seasons with the Tulsa Oilers, a minor league affiliate of the Toronto Maple Leafs, where he got a college degree. Harbaruk was claimed by the Penguins in the 1969 Intra-league draft. Harbaruk played four seasons with the Penguins. In October 1973 he was traded to the St. Louis Blues. After one season with the Blues, Harbaruk then joined the WHA and spent 2-1/2 seasons with the Indianapolis Racers. Harbaruk also played in the minors with Vancouver Canucks, Oklahoma City Blazers, Pittsburgh Hornets and Rochester Americans. After retiring from active play, Harbaruk became the coach of Seneca College in Toronto.

Career statistics

Regular season and playoffs

References

External links
 
 

1943 births
2011 deaths
Burials at York Cemetery, Toronto
Canadian expatriate ice hockey players in the United States
Canadian ice hockey right wingers
Indianapolis Racers players
Oklahoma City Blazers (1965–1977) players
Pittsburgh Hornets players
Pittsburgh Penguins players
Polish emigrants to Canada
Polish ice hockey right wingers
Rochester Americans players
Ice hockey people from Toronto
St. Louis Blues players
Toronto Marlboros players
Tulsa Oilers (1964–1984) players
Vancouver Canucks (WHL) players